Sisyrinchium halophilum is a species of flowering plant in the family Iridaceae known by the common name Nevada blue-eyed grass. It is native to the western United States in and around the Great Basin and Mojave Desert, where it grows in moist, often highly alkaline habitat, such as seeps, meadows, and mineral springs.

Description
Sisyrinchium halophilum is rhizomatous perennial herb takes a clumpy form, producing waxy stems up 26 to 40 centimeters in maximum height. The flat leaves are grasslike. The flower has six tepals measuring roughly one centimeter long each. They are pale blue to purple-blue with yellow bases. The tepal tips are often squared or notched or have a tiny point. The fruit is a beige capsule.

References

External links
Jepson Manual Treatment - Sisyrinchium halophilum
USDA Plants Profile: Sisyrinchium halophilum
Flora of North America
Sisyrinchium halophilum - Photo gallery

halophilum
Flora of the California desert regions
Flora of the Great Basin
Flora of Nevada
Flora of North America
Flora without expected TNC conservation status